 
Jigsaw is an interactive fiction (IF) game, written by Graham Nelson in 1995.

The game begins on New Year's Eve of 1999, with the player discovering a time machine enabling him or her to travel throughout the twentieth century (including voyage of The Titanic, discovery of penicillin, codebreaking of the enigma machine during World War II, opening of the Suez Canal, and the recording of Abbey Road) to ensure history unfolds 'correctly'.

Jigsaw contains references to other interactive fiction games, including Trinity.  Features of the game include attention to detail, and a romantic relationship between the player's character and another central character whose gender is never revealed (allowing the player to project the gender of their choice onto both).

Jigsaw has been described as "acclaimed," "epic...notable," and as "[perhaps] one of the most fun educational games in existence".  The gameplay is challenging.

See also
 Carmen Sandiego (1985+ educational videogame series) 
 Trinity (video game) (1986 game by Infocom that is referenced in Jigsaw) 
 Curses (video game) (1993 game by Nelson which has some linkage to Jigsaw) 
 Forrest Gump (1994 movie where the protagonist appears at the scene of many major historical events)

Notes

References

External links 
 
 "Jigsaw" at the IFDB

1995 video games
1990s interactive fiction
Video games developed in the United Kingdom
Windows games
Video games about time travel
Romance video games